An anticyclonic storm is a storm with a high-pressure center, in which winds flow in the direction opposite to that of the flow above a region of low pressure. These storms can create powerful mesoanticylonic supercell storms that can generate anticyclonic tornadoes. Examples include the anticyclonic blizzard of 2018, Hartmut, and Neptune's anticyclonic cloud system.

Description
Anticyclonic storms usually form around high-pressure systems where air moves apart and sinks. Air at the center of these storms is forced away from the high pressure zones and replaced by a downdraft of air from higher altitudes. Anticyclonic storms have fewer clouds than cyclonic storms, due to a lower humidity. This lower humidity is caused by the air compressing and heating up as it moves downward.

Anticyclonic storms, as high-pressure systems, usually accompany cold weather and are frequently a factor in large snowstorms. Along a cold front, an anticyclonic storm is called a wave, frontal, or mid-latitude anticyclonic storm when they are connected to a weather front. Due to the Coriolis effect, anticyclonic storms involve clockwise flow  in the Northern Hemisphere and counterclockwise flow in the Southern Hemisphere.

Antimesocyclonic supercells 
Supercells are long-lasting convective storms that are formed when thunderstorms are accompanied by strong vertical wind shear.  For an antimesocyclone to form, there must be strong convective energy for cloud systems to be heavily reinforced with moist air. A supercell has a rotating updraft (mid-altitude mesocyclone) and a downdraft. The rotating updraft typically moves to the right. When it moves to the left (anticyclonically), mesoanticylonic super-cells are created. Anticyclonic supercells can produce hail storms, but rarely produce anticyclonic tornados.

Anticyclonic tornadoes 
Tornadoes' vortices are low-pressure regions, but tornadoes rotate anticyclonically because tornadoes occur on a small enough scale that Coriolis effect is negligible. Anticyclonic supercells can go through tornadogenesis to develop into anticyclonic tornadoes.

Examples 

 Hartmut, Scandinavia: From 25 February – 4 March 2018, a Siberian airmass triggered a rare instance of an "anticyclonic blizzard" during an exceptionally strong anticyclone with hurricane-force maximum gusts of 187 km/h (116 mph) and peak central pressure of 1056 hPa. It caused the Beast from the East, a deadly cold wave that channeled freezing air and large amounts of snow over Europe. The interaction of Anticyclone Hartmut and Cyclone Emma intensified the wind and snowfall threat in Western Europe, particularly the British Isles.
 Neptune: In 1989, Voyager 2 discovered an anticyclonic cloud system (DS2) in convective storms at 55°S on Neptune. There were bright and high clouds associated with this system with an anticyclonic vortex. These cloud systems on Neptune are known as 'companion clouds' because they are formed similarly to the cloud structures on Earth that can lead to anticyclonic storms. Voyager 2 discovered convective storms where one of which resembled anticyclonic behavior. This convective storm was located in the DS2 anticyclone located at 55°S. There were bright and high clouds associated with this system with an anticyclonic vortex.

See also 
Anticyclone
Anticyclonic tornado
Great Red Spot

References

External links 
 Science Video: "Jupiter's Little Red Spot Planetary Scientists Detect Strong Winds In Anticyclone On Jupiter".  Article/video date: November 1, 2008.

Storm
Anticyclones